The Landmark is a skyscraper located in Xitun District, Taichung, Taiwan. As of December 2020, it is the tallest in Taichung and 11th tallest in Taiwan.

The appearance design is based on the shape of a Chinese-style comb. The whole building adopts the most simple and stable long rectangle, and the corners are cut to arc to soften the skyline. The building materials of the whole building are made of beige granite and grey glass, and partly matched with dark grey metal panels.

See also 
 List of tallest buildings in Taiwan
 List of tallest buildings in Taichung
 Taichung’s 7th Redevelopment Zone

References

Buildings and structures in Taichung
Skyscraper office buildings in Taichung
Office buildings completed in 2018
Taichung's 7th Redevelopment Zone